Mathieu Barrau (born 3 September 1977 in Beaumont-de-Lomagne, France is a French international rugby union  scrum half principally for SU Agen.

Barrau made his international début for France in July 2004, against usa, but would have to fight with Pierre Mignoni, Dimitri Yachvili, Frédéric Michalak but mostly Jean-Baptiste Élissalde for the France number 9 shirt. .

External links
 ESPN profile

1977 births
Living people
French rugby union players
Rugby union scrum-halves
France international rugby union players